Dichocera is a genus of bristle flies in the family Tachinidae. There are about seven described species in Dichocera.

Species
These seven species belong to the genus Dichocera:
 Dichocera auranticauda (Arnaud, 1963)
 Dichocera dichoceroides (Arnaud, 1963)
 Dichocera latifrons O'Hara, 2002
 Dichocera lyrata Williston, 1895
 Dichocera orientalis Coquillett, 1897
 Dichocera riederi (Reinhard, 1943)
 Dichocera robusta Brooks, 1945

References

Further reading

External links

 
 

Tachininae